The Town of N is a 1935 novel by Leonid Dobychin. Publication of the novel caused criticism (the novel was attacked for "formalism"), leading to the author's disappearance and the presumable death by suicide. 
Although the town N takes its name from a town in Gogol's Dead Souls it is probably based on Dvinsk. Publication of the novel in 1935 caused criticism leading to the author's disappearance and the presumable death by suicide. It is being compared to the novels by James Joyce and Marcel Proust. It was first published in English in 1998.

The novel follows the stream of consciousness of a boy from age seven in 1901 until he is 15. The boy relates events of his family, school years, father's death, readings, first romance and the eruption of the Russo-Japanese War. The author's irony and the main character's description of the provincial society in which he lives also make the novel close to Dead Souls.

References

1935 Russian novels
1998 novels
Soviet novels
Modernist novels
Censored books
Russian bildungsromans
Novels set in 20th-century Russia
Novels set in the 1900s